Melinda Ruth Dillon (October 13, 1939 – January 9, 2023) was an American actress. She received a 1963 Tony Award nomination for her Broadway debut in the original production of Who's Afraid of Virginia Woolf?, and she was nominated for the Academy Award for Best Supporting Actress for her roles as Jillian Guiler in Close Encounters of the Third Kind (1977) and Teresa Perrone in Absence of Malice (1981). She is well known for her role as Mother Parker in the holiday classic A Christmas Story (1983). Her other film roles include Bound for Glory (1976), F.I.S.T. (1978), Harry and the Hendersons (1987), The Prince of Tides (1991), and Magnolia (1999), for which she was nominated for a Screen Actors Guild Award.

Early life
Dillon was born as Melinda Ruth Clardy on October 13, 1939, in Hope, Arkansas, but raised in Cullman, Alabama. After spending four years in Germany, Dillon attended Hyde Park High School and the Goodman School of Drama at the Art Institute of Chicago (now at DePaul University) in Chicago.

Career
Though best known for her supporting performances in films, Dillon began as an improvisational comedian and stage actress. Recalling her performance as Sonya in a 1961 student production of Chekhov's Uncle Vanya, Alan Schneider wrote:What distinguished and made the whole attempt worthwhile for me was casting the role of Sonya with a young actress named Linda Dillon, who was a senior acting student at Goodman as well as a hanger-on with a Second City troupe that included two young performers named Barbara Harris and Alan Arkin. During our tryouts, John Reich, then the Goodman Theatre's artistic director, had seriously tried to discourage me from using Linda. He admitted her talent but warned me that she was highly volatile and completely unpredictable as an actress. He had found another actress whom he found much more suitable for Sonya. I insisted on using Linda, no matter the consequences. I was fascinated by the combination of her fragility and sensuality, intrigued with the unconventional way in which she was able to make a line seem utterly spontaneous, and impressed with her emotional range and richness. During our four weeks of rehearsal [...], I wound up alternately adoring and hating Linda. She always did too much and yet not enough. She was never the same twice in a given scene, even when she had found something wonderful last time. She was always wanting to quit the cast or leave school or kill herself. And yet, at the same time, I felt she was extraordinary, the most talented young actress I'd ever worked with, the potential peer of Geraldine Page and perhaps even Kim Stanley. I was sure she'd be a big star one day, and I wanted to be with her when that happened.

Dillon's first major role was as Honey in the original 1962 Broadway production of Edward Albee's Who's Afraid of Virginia Woolf, for which she was nominated for the Tony Award for Best Performance by a Featured Actress in a Play, and she also appeared in You Know I Can't Hear You When the Water's Running and Paul Sill's Story Theatre.

In 1959, she acted in The Cry of Jazz, an influential short film dealing with jazz music and Black culture. Dillon's first feature film was The April Fools in 1969. She also worked in television, notably in a guest-starring role in 1969 on an episode of the hit TV series Bonanza titled "A Lawman's Lot Is Not a Happy One" (Season 11). She co-starred with David Carradine in the 1976 Woody Guthrie biopic Bound for Glory and was nominated in the Best Female Acting Debut category of the Golden Globe for her role as Memphis Sue.

The following year she was nominated for a Best Supporting Actress Oscar for the role of a mother whose child is abducted by aliens in Steven Spielberg's Close Encounters of the Third Kind. That same year, she made an uncredited cameo in The Muppet Movie and had a role in the comedy Slap Shot with Paul Newman. Four years later, Dillon was again nominated for a Best Supporting Actress Oscar for her performance as a suicidal teacher in Absence of Malice in 1981, working again with Newman.

Dillon was perhaps best known for her role as the mother of Ralphie and Randy in Bob Clark's 1983 movie A Christmas Story. The film was based on a series of short stories and novels written by Jean Shepherd about young Ralphie Parker (played by Peter Billingsley) and his quest for a Red Ryder BB gun from Santa Claus. 

Four years later, Dillon co-starred with John Lithgow in the Bigfoot comedy Harry and the Hendersons. She continued to be active in stage and film throughout the 1990s, taking roles in the Barbra Streisand drama The Prince of Tides, the low-budget Lou Diamond Phillips thriller Sioux City, and the drama How to Make an American Quilt. 

In 1999, she appeared in Magnolia, directed by Paul Thomas Anderson, as Rose Gator, the estranged wife of terminally ill television game-show host Jimmy Gator (Philip Baker Hall). In 2005, she guest-starred in the episode of Law & Order: Special Victims Unit titled "Blood". Dillon's last major acting role was in the 2007 film Reign Over Me.

Personal life and death
Dillon was married to actor Richard Libertini and together they had a son. They divorced in 1978.

A Methodist, Dillon was a staffer on Democrat Eugene McCarthy's 1968 presidential campaign.

Dillon died on January 9, 2023, at the age of 83. Her remains were cremated.

Filmography

Film

Television

Notes

References

Further reading
 "Hyde Park Seniors to Give Show". Chicago Tribune. June 9, 1957. p. 8
 "Jack and the Beanstalk". Chicago Tribune. November 8, 1959. p. 
 "Billy Eden Wolf and Linda Dillon in 'Rumpelstiltskin'". Chicago Tribune. March 20, 1960. Part 7, Sec. 2, p. 4
 Lyons, Herb (September 19, 1961). "Tower Ticker". Chicago Tribune. p. 22
 "Education and Training for the Stage: The Goodman Memorial Theatre School of Drama". Volume 55 Number 4, 1961. The Art Institute of Chicago Quarterly. pp. 74, 76

External links

1939 births
2023 deaths
20th-century American actresses
21st-century American actresses
Actresses from Alabama
American film actresses
American stage actresses
American television actresses
People from Cullman, Alabama
Methodists from Alabama
Hyde Park Academy High School alumni